William Kyle Rote, Sr. (October 27, 1928 – August 15, 2002) was an American professional football player who was a running back and wide receiver for eleven years in the National Football League (NFL) for the New York Giants. He was an All-American running back for the SMU Mustangs and was the first overall selection of the 1951 NFL Draft.  Following his playing career, Rote was the Giants backfield coach and was a sports broadcaster for WNEW radio, NBC, and WNBC New York.

Early life
Born and raised in San Antonio, Texas, Rote was the son of Jack and Emma Belle (Owens) Rote.  His family suffered tragedies during World War II; when he was 16, his mother was killed in a car accident and his older brother Jack was killed on Iwo Jima.

Rote attended Thomas Jefferson High School in San Antonio, where he earned All-State honors in both football and basketball, while also being considered one of the region's brightest pro-baseball prospects. He was a running back in football, a guard in basketball, an outfielder in baseball, and a member of the track team.

Collegiate career
After graduating from high school in 1947, Rote accepted an athletic scholarship to Southern Methodist University in Dallas, where he became one of the most celebrated collegiate football players in the country. In December 1949, in a near upset over eventual national champion Notre Dame, Rote ran for 115 yards, threw for 146 yards, and scored all three SMU touchdowns in a 27–20 loss. His performance was voted by the Texas Sportswriters Association as "The Outstanding Individual Performance by a Texas Athlete in the First Half of the 20th Century." Twenty-five years later, Notre Dame made Rote an "Honorary Member" of their Championship Team.

Rote still holds the national collegiate record for the longest punt. In the Cotton Bowl against Oregon in January 1949, SMU was on their own four-yard-line after a Norm Van Brocklin punt. Nearing halftime, Rote quick-kicked on first down from his own end zone, and the ball ended up 84 yards from the line of scrimmage, on the Oregon 

While in college, Rote also played baseball and ran track for the Mustangs; he was inducted into the College Football Hall of Fame in 1964.

Immediately after graduation at SMU, Rote signed a contract with the Corpus Christi Aces of the Class B Gulf Coast Baseball League. In 23 games his batting average was .348.

National Football League career
The New York Giants selected Rote with the first overall pick in the 1951 NFL Draft. He started out as a running back, but after the first two years switched to wide receiver due to a knee injury. When Rote retired after the 1961 season, he had become the Giants' career leader in pass receptions (300), receiving yardage (4,805), and touchdown receptions (48). He was second highest in total touchdowns (56) and fifth-leading scorer (312 points). His average gain per catch was 15.9 yards. In all, Rote played in four world championship games, including the 1956 NFL Championship Game against the Chicago Bears, and the 1958 game won by the Baltimore Colts in sudden-death overtime  known as The Greatest Game, the first ever nationally televised NFL championship game. Rote was the captain of the New York Giants for eight years.

During his career, Rote made a guest appearance as an imposter for an undercover police officer on the May 13, 1958 episode of the CBS game show To Tell the Truth. He  fooled the panel into thinking he was the officer, garnering three of the four possible votes from Polly Bergen, Jim Backus, and Joan Fontaine. Only Hy Gardner voted for the actual undercover police officer.

Rote spearheaded the movement that became the NFL Players Association, fighting for equal opportunities for all players, so that all players of all races would receive equal treatment when the teams played on the road. Rote became the NFLPA's first elected president serving for several years, and also acted as the Giants team representative.

Rote was inducted into the Cotton Bowl Hall of Fame, Texas Sports Hall of Fame, College Football Hall of Fame, Texas Pro Football Hall of Fame, San Antonio Hall of Fame, Texas High School Football Hall of Fame, Texas High School Basketball Hall of Fame, Southwest Conference All-Time Team, and received the SMU Distinguished Alumni Award. In 1995, Rote was named as wide receiver on the All-Time Giants Team in conjunction with the 75th celebration of the founding of the NFL.  The Professional  Football Researchers Association named Rote to the PRFA Hall of Very Good Class of 2006 

Rote retired in April 1962, then was the Giants' backfield coach for two seasons; in both those years, New York captured the NFL's Eastern Division championship, a third consecutive in 1963, but fell in each of the title games.

Sportscasting career
While in the NFL, Rote spent the offseasons as the sports director for radio station WNEW. In the 1960s and early 1970s, like his former Giant teammates Frank Gifford, Pat Summerall, and Thomas Conlin, he enjoyed a second career as a sportscaster, working at NBC and WNBC New York on radio and television.  Rote is generally believed to be the first athlete to use the popular slogan, "You cannot stop a great player like (ex. Jim Brown), you can only hope to contain him."  The phrase is now used commonly to describe different players, and was made popular by former ESPN Sportscaster Dan Patrick, albeit jokingly, using the line to describe marginal competitors.

Personal life
Rote and his first wife, Elizabeth Jeanette Jamison, married in 1949 and had four children – Kyle, Gary, Chris, and Elizabeth. His oldest son, Kyle Rote, Jr., was one of the first notable soccer stars from the United States.  He said of his father, "To me the most remarkable thing about him from a football standpoint was that he had fourteen teammates who named their sons after him." In 1965, Rote married Sharon Ritchie (Miss America 1956); they were divorced in 1973. Rote married Betty-Nina Langmack in 1976.

Rote was the cousin of Tobin Rote, a multi-championship winning and record holding AFL and NFL quarterback.

Rote authored the books, Pro Football for the Fans and The Language of Pro Football, and wrote the Giants Fight Song. He also published two volumes of poetry, was an ASCAP songwriter, accomplished pianist, and oil painter having a number of his works shown at museums throughout the United States.

See also
History of the New York Giants (1925–1978)

References

External links

Kyle Rote Facebook page, maintained by the Rote family
Texas State Historical Association, The History of Texas Online, William Kyle Rote, Sr.

Kyle Rote's Short Sweet Minor League Career
Kyle Rote: Greatest Moments in SMU Mustang's History
Popular Giant Rote Dies at 73, ESPN
Giants' reactions to Rote's death, Sports Illustrated
NY Giants All-Time Teams by era 

1928 births
2002 deaths
Jefferson High School (San Antonio, Texas) alumni
All-American college football players
American Football League announcers
American football running backs
Methodists from Texas
College football announcers
College Football Hall of Fame inductees
Eastern Conference Pro Bowl players
National Football League announcers
National Football League first-overall draft picks
New York Giants announcers
New York Giants players
Sportspeople from San Antonio
Players of American football from San Antonio
SMU Mustangs football players
Corpus Christi Aces players